John Conway founded the city of Mission, Texas in 1907 with J. W. Holt when the two purchased the  La Lomita Ranch from the Oblate fathers. Subdivided parcels were sold to arriving settlers and water was pumped from the Rio Grande by means of a pumping station called the First Lift Station and distributed to the residents of the Rio Grande Valley through the Mission Canal Co. Irrigation System, also started by Conway and Holt.

References

External links

People from Mission, Texas
Year of death missing
Year of birth missing